Nadir Benoufella (in kabyle: Nadir Bennufella) (born April 3, 1987 in Algeria) is an Algerian football player who is currently playing as a goalkeeper for JS Kabylie in the Algerian league.

In October 2007 he was called up to the Algerian military national team.

Club career
 2007-pres. JS Kabylie

Honours
 Won the Algerian League once with JS Kabylie in 2008

External links
 DZFoot Profile
 JSKabylie Profile

1987 births
Algerian footballers
Living people
JS Kabylie players
Association football goalkeepers
21st-century Algerian people